Buckinghamshire County Council in England was elected every four years from 1973 until 2020.

Political control
From 1973 until its merger into Buckinghamshire Council in 2020, political control of the council was consistently held by the Conservative party:

In the 1993 elections, it was the only county council to have elected a majority of Conservative councillors, while the party lost majorities on strongholds such as Essex, Kent and Lincolnshire.

Leadership
The leaders of the council from 2001 until its abolition in 2020 were:

Martin Tett subsequently became first leader of the replacement Buckinghamshire Council in 2020.

Council elections
 1973 Buckinghamshire County Council election
 1977 Buckinghamshire County Council election
 1981 Buckinghamshire County Council election
 1985 Buckinghamshire County Council election
 1989 Buckinghamshire County Council election
 1993 Buckinghamshire County Council election
 1997 Buckinghamshire County Council election
 2001 Buckinghamshire County Council election
 2005 Buckinghamshire County Council election (boundary changes increased the number of seats by 2)
 2009 Buckinghamshire County Council election
 2013 Buckinghamshire County Council election
 2017 Buckinghamshire County Council election

County result maps

By-election results

1997-2001

2001-2005

2005-2009

2009-2013

References

 By-election results

External links
Buckinghamshire County Council

 
Council elections in Buckinghamshire
County council elections in England